Stafford Motor Speedway is a semi-banked 1/2 mile paved oval located in Stafford Springs, Connecticut. Stafford Speedway holds weekly racing every Friday night May through September. This track is known as the home of the SK Modifieds and drivers such as Ryan Preece and Ted Christopher. The track hosts weekly events throughout the season including 3 NASCAR Whelen Modified Tour events yearly. Stafford Motor Speedway is the track that had hosted the second most ever races in the modern era of the NASCAR Whelen Modified Tour with 131 races from 1985 to 2019.

The speedway also had hosted 5 NASCAR North Tour events from 1979 until 1985 and 30 NASCAR K&N Pro Series East races, between 1987 and 2016.

Stafford Motor Speedway was the site of the first ever Superstar Racing Experience event on June 12, 2021. The main event was won by track regular Doug Coby

In December 2020, the track announced that it would end its 60-year affiliation with NASCAR, "due to a conflict regarding ownership of streaming and broadcast rights of weekly racing events". Stafford began live streaming on FloRacing in 2021.

History

Originally known as the Stafford Springs Agricultural Park, the facility was used as a half-mile horse racing facility up to the end of World War II when it switched to automobile racing. The facility became a NASCAR track in 1959 as a dirt track, under the ownership of Rockville auto dealer Mal Barlow, Barlow paved the track in 1967. It was purchased by the Arute brothers, Chuck and Jack Arute in 1970. Jack's son Mark Arute continues to own and manage the track.

Notable drivers 

Geoff Bodine
Brett Bodine
Ron Bouchard
Ken Bouchard
Greg Sacks
Doug Coby
Jerry Cook
Dale Earnhardt
Richie Evans
Jimmy Spencer
Mike Stefanik
Ted Christopher
Don McTavish
Ryan Preece
Donny Travaglin
Martin Truex Jr.

References

External links

Stafford Motor Speedway website
Stafford Motor Speedway archive at Racing-Reference

NASCAR tracks
Motorsport venues in Connecticut
Stafford, Connecticut
Sports venues completed in 1870